Coral Annabell Buttsworth (née McInnes; 7 June 1900 – 20 December 1985) was a female tennis player from Australia who won the singles title at the Australian Championships in 1931 and 1932 and the women's doubles title there in 1932. In 1933 she again made the final of the Australian Championships but was defeated in straight sets by first-seeded Joan Hartigan.

Buttsworth was the only multiple winner of the singles title at the Australian Championships who never won a state singles title. A strong, thick-set woman from Sydney, she was addicted to chopping the ball, with an excellent drop shot, and was quick around the court. She was a player who preferred to maneuver opponents out of position by running them up and back on the court rather than from side to side.

Grand Slam finals

Singles (2 titles, 1 runner-up)

Doubles (1 title)

Grand Slam singles tournament timeline

References

See also
 List of Australian Open women's singles champions
 Performance timelines for all female tennis players who reached at least one Grand Slam final

Australian Championships (tennis) champions
Australian female tennis players
People from Taree
Tennis people from New South Wales
1900 births
1985 deaths
Grand Slam (tennis) champions in women's singles
Grand Slam (tennis) champions in women's doubles